On August 19, 1989, a large steam explosion in front of a residential building generated a large asbestos-containing steam cloud in the Gramercy Park neighborhood of Manhattan, New York City. Two people – a Con Ed worker and a 3rd floor resident – died instantly and 24 were injured. A third person, another Con Ed worker, died the following day. Two hundred residents were displaced for months while cleanup crews worked to remove asbestos-containing mud from building facades. All apartments were remediated by asbestos workers and tested for airborne asbestos.

Workers from Con Ed, the major utility company in the area, were repairing a high pressure steam pipe in front of the building when a  connecting sleeve burst, releasing hot steam and debris upwards. Laboratory testing afterwards determined that the insulating material contained asbestos, which subsequently led to a large-scale evacuation and cleanup.  The release from the explosion, in front of 32 Gramercy Park at the corner of 20th Street and Third Avenue, continued for several hours with debris reaching 18 stories. The pipe was covered with asbestos magnesia block insulation which was pulverized and dispersed with the rising steam cloud.

Con Ed initially failed to report that the debris contained asbestos, but after 4 days announced that the 200 pounds of insulation did contain the cancer-causing material. Five years later, when indicted on the same issue, the company pleaded guilty to conspiracy and environmental law violations in Federal District Court in Manhattan for withholding that information. The final remediation and cleanup cost totaled approximately $90 million, making this one of the most expensive asbestos cleanup projects in history.

See also
 2007 New York City steam explosion

References

Explosions in 1989
Disasters in New York City
1989 disasters in the United States
Industrial fires and explosions in the United States
1989 in New York City
1980s in Manhattan
Consolidated Edison
Asbestos steam explosion
August 1989 events in the United States